Chuchery is a rural locality (a village) in Pokrovskoye Rural Settlement, Velikoustyugsky District, Vologda Oblast, Russia. The population was 56 as of 2002.

Geography 
Chuchery is located 25 km southeast of Veliky Ustyug (the district's administrative centre) by road. Novoselovo is the nearest rural locality.

References 

Rural localities in Velikoustyugsky District